Arakul is a rural locality (a selo) in Rutulsky District, Republic of Dagestan, Russia. The population was  423 as of 2010. There are 2 streets.

Geography 
Arakul is located 38 km northwest of Rutul (the district's administrative centre) by road. Verkhny Katrukh and Nizhny Katrukh are the nearest rural localities.

Nationalities 
Laks live there.

References 

Rural localities in Rutulsky District